"Tragic" (stylised as TRAGIC) is a song by Australian rapper The Kid Laroi featuring YoungBoy Never Broke Again and Internet Money, released on November 6, 2020, as the third track from the deluxe edition of The Kid Laroi's debut mixtape F*ck Love.

Composition
"Tragic" is a "sparse soundtrack of looping snares and high piano keys" which's "beat is off-set and drops in and out of the mix." The song is "carefully arranged so as not to interrupt or distract from each of the vocal deliveries." It's noted that the song is The Kid Laroi's "autobiographical account of how he has made something of himself" and that "he's not so much angry as hurting."

Music video
The accompanying Steve Cannon-directed music video was released on December 28, 2020. Heran Mamo from Billboard compares The Kid Laroi in the video to a modern Robin Hood who steals to give back to his less fortunate family. At the time of the video's release, YoungBoy was incarcerated regarding firearms charges.

Charts

Certifications

References

2020 songs
The Kid Laroi songs
Songs written by the Kid Laroi
YoungBoy Never Broke Again songs
Songs written by YoungBoy Never Broke Again
Columbia Records singles
Sony Music singles